26 Squadron may refer to:
No. 26 Squadron PAF
No. 26 Squadron RAF
No. 26 Squadron RAAF
No. 26 Squadron SAAF